Prince of Wales Public School, established in 1919, is located on Monaghan Road in Peterborough, Ontario. It is a member of the Kawartha Pine Ridge District School Board. It has approximately 650 students in full attendance, ranging from JK to Grade 8. Prince of Wales offers French immersion to students in grades sk-8.

Community Hub
The school has been designated a Community Hub by the Peterborough Poverty Reduction Network. The boundaries of the new hub are: Aylmer St. to  Goodfellow Road; and Charlotte Street to Lansdowne Street. The hub serves to unify the community through a variety of family activities.

See also
 Monarchy in Ontario

References

Elementary schools in Peterborough, Ontario
Educational institutions established in 1919
1919 establishments in Ontario